The Thomas Merton Center is a non-profit grassroots organization in Pittsburgh whose mission to build and support collaborative movements that empower marginalized populations to advance collective liberation from oppressive systems.

The Center was co-founded by Molly Rush and Larry Kessler in 1972. The Thomas Merton Center is named after Thomas Merton, a Trappist monk of the Abbey of Gethsemani who wrote prolifically about issues related to peace and justice.

History

The traditional base of the Center was radical Catholic pacifists, but has since expanded to secular humanists and diverse community perspectives concerned with building a more peaceful and just world.  The Center began in 1972 to protest the continuation of the Vietnam War, to work against federal cutbacks and to raise money to provide medical aid to Indochina.

The Center has also protested and peacefully demonstrated against a variety of issues including world and local hunger, exploitation of workers, militarism, and racial discrimination.

During the 1980s, the Center worked extensively on nuclear disarmament, targeting local weapons makers Rockwell and Westinghouse, as well as organizing campaigns of solidarity and support to the people of Central and Latin American countries that were targeted by the Reagan administration.  In the 1990s, organizing against the Gulf War and in response to the murder of Johnny Gammage by police, among other projects, were undertaken. With the invasion of Iraq in 2003, the Center became central in organizing Pittsburgh's large anti-war protests and most recently served to facilitate and organize many of the educational and protest activities in September 2009 against and in response to the G20 Summit, including the Peoples' March, which was one of the largest protests in Pittsburgh in decades. Several local institutions grew out of the Center, including the Pittsburgh chapter of Amnesty International and the Greater Pittsburgh Community Food Bank.

Currently the center has active campaigns focused on building the New Economy Working Group movement, integrating the work of environmental justice groups locally, and creating a more peaceful world by working to end wars globally.

The Thomas Merton Award, a peace prize, has been awarded since 1972 by the Center. Past recipients include Dorothy Day, Noam Chomsky, Vandana Shiva, Martin Sheen and Fr. Roy Bourgeois.

Current Structure
Its current structure includes a Board of Directors, committees, affiliates, friends, projects, and members. Membership dues and donations provide much of the funding and the Board of Directors are elected to make decisions related to governance of policies at the Center. Several of the most active projects include Book 'Em, a books for prisoners program; the Environmental Justice Committee, the Pittsburgh Darfur Coalition, Haiti Solidarity, the Pittsburgh Chapter of Code Pink, Roots of Promise, Marcellus Protest Group, Fed Up! the Pittsburgh chapter of the Human Rights Coalition, and The East End Community Thrift Shop, which provides clothing and household items for low-income individuals in the area.

The Thomas Merton Center has four key focus areas: peace and non-violence; human rights; environmental justice; and economic justice. The Thomas Merton Center also acts as a fiscal umbrella for a number of smaller organizations that align with the peace and justice mission of the center. To name a few, Book'em Books for Prisoner program, Haiti Solidarity, Pittsburgh Progressive Notebook, Fight for Lifers West, Human Rights Coalition Fed' Up, Pittsburgh Darfur Coalition, Roots of Promise, Marcellus Protest Group, and Westmoreland Marcellus Protest Group.

Publication
The Thomas Merton Center publishes a monthly newspaper entitled The New People. It is a peace and justice newspaper for Pittsburgh and the Tri-State area. Published 11 times a year, "it fills the voids left by the mainstream media by providing an outlet that reflects progressive and alternative politics: locally, nationally and globally."

The paper reports on the issues of war, poverty, racism and oppression, by focusing on the non-violent struggle to bring about a more peaceful and just world. The New People also acts as an organizing tool for Thomas Merton Center members and the activist community.

References

External links
 Homepage
 Fact Sheet - The Thomas Merton Center for Peace & Justice (3/14/2006) at ACLU
 Finding aid to the Thomas Merton Center Records at the Archives Service Center, University of Pittsburgh

Organizations based in Pittsburgh
Organizations established in 1972
Social justice organizations